Dictyssa is a genus of tropiduchid planthoppers in the family Tropiduchidae. There are about 17 described species in Dictyssa.

Species
These 17 species belong to the genus Dictyssa:

 Dictyssa areolata Melichar, 1906
 Dictyssa beameri Doering, 1938
 Dictyssa clathrata Melichar, 1906
 Dictyssa doeringae (Ball, 1936)
 Dictyssa fenestrata Ball, 1910
 Dictyssa fusca Melichar, 1906
 Dictyssa leonilae O'Brien, 1986
 Dictyssa maculosa Doering, 1938
 Dictyssa marginepunctata Melichar, 1906
 Dictyssa mira Van Duzee, 1928
 Dictyssa monroviana Doering, 1938
 Dictyssa mutata Melichar, 1906
 Dictyssa obliqua Ball, 1910
 Dictyssa ovata Ball, 1910
 Dictyssa quadravitrea Doering, 1938
 Dictyssa schuhi O'Brien, 1986
 Dictyssa transversa Van Duzee, 1914

References

Further reading

 

Auchenorrhyncha genera
Articles created by Qbugbot
Elicini